Estradiol salicylate, or estradiol 3-salicylate, is a synthetic estrogen and estrogen ester – specifically, the C3 salicylic acid ester of estradiol – which was described in the late 1980s and was never marketed. It is a metabolite of estradiol acetylsalicylate, which appears to be very rapidly hydrolyzed into estradiol salicylate.

See also
 List of estrogen esters § Estradiol esters

References

Abandoned drugs
Estradiol esters
Prodrugs
Salicylic acids